Donia is a genus of mites in the family Laelapidae.

Species
 Donia gehennalis (Oudemans, 1916)

References

Laelapidae